The 2022 Rio Grande Valley FC Toros season is the 7th season for Rio Grande Valley FC Toros in USL Championship (USL-C), the second-tier professional soccer league in the United States and Canada. This article covers the period from November 29, 2021, the day after the 2021 USL-C Playoff Final, to the conclusion of the 2022 USL-C Playoff Final, scheduled to be completed before November 14, 2021.

Club

Competitions

USL Championship

Match results

Standings — Western Conference

Play-offs

Match results

U.S. Open Cup 

With the end of their affiliation agreement with the Houston Dynamo, Rio Grande Valley FC is eligible to compete in the U.S. Open Cup for the first time in club history in 2022.

Statistics 

Numbers after plus-sign(+) denote appearances as a substitute.

Appearances and goals

|-

Top scorers
{| class="wikitable" style="font-size: 95%; text-align: center;"
|-
!width=30|Rank
!width=30|Position
!width=30|Number
!width=175|Name
!width=75|
!width=75|
!width=75|
!width=75|Total
|-
|1
|MF
|7
|align="left"| Jonas Fjeldberg
|9
|0
|0
|9
|-
|2
|MF
|29
|align="left"|
|8
|0
|0
|8
|-
|3
|FW
|9
|align="left"|
|6
|0
|1
|7
|-
|4
|MF
|8
|align="left"|
|5
|0
|0
|5
|-
|rowspan=2|5
|DF
|21
|align="left"|
|4
|0
|0
|4
|-
|MF
|17
|align="left"|
|4
|0
|0
|4
|-
|rowspan=2|7
|MF
|4
|align="left"|
|3
|0
|0
|3
|-
|MF
|22
|align="left"|
|3
|0
|0
|3
|-
|rowspan="4"|8
|DF
|3
|align="left"|
|2
|0
|0
|2
|-
|FW
|18
|align="left"|
|2
|0
|0
|2
|-
|MF
|23
|align="left"|
|1
|0
|1
|2
|-
|DF
|31
|align="left"|
|2
|0
|0
|2
|-
|rowspan="6"|11
|MF
|5
|align="left"|
|1
|0
|0
|1
|-
|FW
|13
|align="left"|
|1
|0
|0
|1
|-
|DF
|15
|align="left"|
|1
|0
|0
|1
|-
|FW
|16
|align="left"|
|1
|0
|0
|1
|-
|FW
|19
|align="left"|
|1
|0
|0
|1
|-
|FW
|22
|align="left"|
|1
|0
|0
|1
|-
!colspan="4"|Total
! 52
! 0
! 2
! 54
|-

Top assists
{| class="wikitable" style="font-size: 95%; text-align: center;"
|-
!width=30|Rank
!width=30|Position
!width=30|Number
!width=175|Name
!width=75|
!width=75|
!width=75|
!width=75|Total
|-
|rowspan=2|1
|MF
|10
|align="left"| José Torres
|9
|0
|0
|9
|-
|MF
|17
|align="left"| Ricky Ruiz
|8
|0
|1
|9
|-
|2
|MF
|6
|align="left"| Isidro Martinez
|6
|0
|1
|7
|-
|rowspan=2|4
|MF
|8
|align="left"| Wahab Ackwei
|5
|0
|0
|5
|-
|MF
|3
|align="left"| Emilio Ycaza
|5
|0
|0
|5
|-
|6
|MF
|29
|align="left"| Christian Pinzon
|3
|0
|0
|3
|-
|7
|FW
|9
|align="left"| Frank López
|2
|0
|0
|2
|-
|rowspan="5"|8
|FW
|19
|align="left"| Adolfo Hernández
|1
|0
|0
|1
|-
|DF
|20
|align="left"| Jonathan Ricketts
|1
|0
|0
|1
|-
|DF
|21
|align="left"| Robert Coronado
|1
|0
|0
|1
|-
|MF
|22
|align="left"| Juan Torres
|1
|0
|0
|1
|-
|DF
|24
|align="left"| Luka Malešević
|1
|0
|0
|1
|-
!colspan="4"|Total
! 42
! 0
! 2
! 44
|-

Disciplinary record
{| class="wikitable" style="text-align:center;"
|-
| rowspan="2" !width=15|
| rowspan="2" !width=15|
| rowspan="2" !width=120|Player
| colspan="3"|USL Championship
| colspan="3"|USL Playoffs
| colspan="3"|U.S. Open Cup
| colspan="3"|Total
|-
!width=34; background:#fe9;|
!width=34; background:#fe9;|
!width=34; background:#ff8888;|
!width=34; background:#fe9;|
!width=34; background:#fe9;|
!width=34; background:#ff8888;|
!width=34; background:#fe9;|
!width=34; background:#fe9;|
!width=34; background:#ff8888;|
!width=34; background:#fe9;|
!width=34; background:#fe9;|
!width=34; background:#ff8888;|
|-
|1
|GK
|align="left"| Tyler Deric
|2||0||0||0||0||0||0||0||0||2||0||0
|-
|2
|DF
|align="left"| Daniel Luis
|2||0||0||0||0||0||0||0||0||2||0||0
|-
|3
|DF
|align="left"| Wahab Ackwei
|4||0||0||0||0||0||0||0||0||4||0||0
|-
|4
|DF
|align="left"| Erik Pimentel
|8||0||1||0||0||0||0||0||0||8||0||1
|-
|5
|MF
|align="left"| Juan Cabezas
|7||0||0||0||0||0||0||0||0||7||0||0
|-
|6
|MF
|align="left"| Isidro Martinez
|4||0||0||0||0||0||0||0||0||4||0||0
|-
|7
|MF
|align="left"| Jonas Fjeldberg
|1||0||0||0||0||0||0||0||0||1||0||0
|-
|8
|MF
|align="left"| Emilio Ycaza
|6||0||1||0||0||0||0||0||0||6||0||1
|-
|9
|FW
|align="left"| Frank López
|7||0||0||0||0||0||0||0||0||7||0||0
|-
|10
|MF
|align="left"| José Torres
|2||0||1||0||0||0||0||0||0||2||0||1
|-
|14
|DF
|align="left"| Stefan Mueller
|2||0||0||0||0||0||0||0||0||2||0||0
|-
|15
|DF
|align="left"| Jesús Vázquez
|4||0||0||0||0||0||0||0||0||4||0||0
|-
|17
|MF
|align="left"| Ricky Ruiz
|5||0||0||0||0||0||0||0||0||5||0||0
|-
|18
|FW
|align="left"| Dylan Borczak
|1||0||0||0||0||0||0||0||0||1||0||0
|-
|19
|FW
|align="left"| Adolfo Hernández
|2||0||0||0||0||0||0||0||0||2||0||0
|-
|20
|DF
|align="left"| Jonathan Ricketts
|6||0||0||0||0||0||1||0||0||7||0||0
|-
|21
|DF
|align="left"| Robert Coronado
|2||1||0||0||0||0||0||0||0||2||1||0
|-
|22
|MF
|align="left"| Juan Torres
|2||0||0||0||0||0||0||0||0||2||0||0
|-
|23
|MF
|align="left"| Frank Nodarse
|4||0||0||0||0||0||1||0||0||4||0||0
|-
|24
|DF
|align="left"| Luka Malešević
|6||0||0||0||0||0||0||0||0||6||0||0
|-
|25
|GK
|align="left"| Javier Garcia
|1||0||0||0||0||0||0||0||0||1||0||0
|-
|29
|MF
|align="left"| Christain Pinzon
|1||0||0||0||0||0||0||0||0||1||0||0
|-
|31
|DF
|align="left"| Akeem Ward
|8||0||0||0||0||0||0||0||0||8||0||0
|-
|colspan="3"|Total||82||1||3||0||0||0||2||0||0||84||1||3

Awards and Honors

USL Championship All League teams

References

2022
Rio Grande
Rio Grande Valley FC
Rio Grande